Ghent University Museum or Gents Universitair Museum (established 2020) is a science museum in Ghent, Belgium, affiliated to Ghent University. It subsumes several of the university's heritage collections, including that of the Museum of the History of Sciences which closed in 2018.

The opening, originally planned for March 2020, was delayed until October 2020 by the impact of the COVID-19 pandemic in Belgium.

References

External links
 
 https://www.ugent.be/en/ghentuniv/facilities/gum

University museums
Science museums
Museums in Ghent
2020 establishments in Belgium